Un Junte Pa' La Historia (English: A Match For History) is a compilation album by Wisin & Yandel. This album contains songs with the participation of singers from various genres.

Track listing

 Un Junte Pa' La Historia (Intro) (feat. Naldo)
 Rakata (feat. Ja Rule)
 Lloro Por Ti (feat. Enrique Iglesias)
 Wanna Ride (feat. Bone Thugs-n-Harmony)
 Lento (feat. RBD)
 Stars Are Blind (feat. Paris Hilton)
 Torre de Babel (Remix) (Solo Tu) (feat. David Bisbal)
 Asi Soy (feat. 50 Cent & G-Unit)
 Absolut (feat. Lenny Kravitz)
 Pegao (feat. Elephant Man)
 Quisiera Saber (feat. Eve)
 Soy del Callejón (feat. Hector El Father & N.O.R.E)
 Jangueo (feat. Fat Joe  & Eazy-E)
 Burn It Up (feat. R. Kelly)
 Sexy Movimiento (feat. Nelly Furtado)
 Donde Está El Amor (feat. Franco de Vita)
 Mami (feat. Rupee)
 No Llores (feat. Gloria Estefan)
 Yo Te Quiero (feat. Luis Fonsi)
 Una Llamada (feat. Tisuby & Georgina)
 Lets Get High (feat. Sean Paul)

External links

 http://www.wisinyandelpr.com/

Wisin & Yandel albums
2009 compilation albums